A Little Nightmare Music is an opera in "one irrevocable act" by Peter Schickele under the pseudonym he uses for parodies and comical works P. D. Q. Bach. The title of the work refers to the English translation of Mozart's famous Eine kleine Nachtmusik (A Little Night Music). The opera is described as being "based on a dream he had December 4, 1791, the night that Wolfgang Amadeus Mozart died and Antonio Salieri didn't." The opera was "newly exhumed" (a.k.a. premiered) at Carnegie Hall on December 27, 1982. It was later recorded with the premiere cast and released on CD by Vanguard Records in 1983. The album also includes two other works by P. D. Q. Bach: an octet (Octoot for wind instruments) and a parody of Handel's Water Music and Music for the Royal Fireworks, Royal Firewater Musick.

Performers
Professor Peter Schickele conducting the New York Pick-Up Ensemble
James Billings, baritone (Antonio Salieri, a successful composer)
Bruce Ford, tenor (Peter Schläfer, a mysterious writer)
Gerald Tarack, violinist (Wolfgang Amadeus Mozart, a not-successful composer)
Paul Dunkel, flute
Susan Palma, flute
Steve Taylor, oboe
Pamela Epple, oboe
Charles Russo, clarinet
John Moses, clarinet
Lauren Goldstein, bassoon
Jane Taylor, bassoon

Recording
A recording of the original cast of the opera was made. Since the opera is short, the recording also includes two other works by P.D.Q. Bach, Octoot for wind instruments, S. 8 and Royal Firewater Musick, for bottles and orchestra (original version), S. 1/5. The track listing is as follows:

A Little Nightmare Music, an opera in one irrevocable act, S. 35
Aria: "What sweet music" (Salieri)
Aria: "Nature gave us eyes" (Schläfer)
Duet: "Uh Oh"
Finale: "What hutzpah!"
Octoot for wind instruments, S. 8
Vite, tout de suite
Lent, tout au moins
Minuet et, tout à l'heure, trio
Chanson: "Toute l'année, hey, hey, hey"
Tout à coup le bout
Royal Firewater Musick for bottles and orchestra, S. 1/5
Long; neat; long
March on the rocks
Minuet with a twist
Sarabande straight up
One for the road

Sources

 P.D.Q. Bach: A Little Nightmare Music

External links
 The Key of P. D. Q. Bach

Musical parodies
1982 operas
P. D. Q. Bach
Operas
English-language operas
Operas based on real people
Operas set in Austria
Operas set in the 18th century
Cultural depictions of Wolfgang Amadeus Mozart
Cultural depictions of Antonio Salieri
Vanguard Records albums